Saidullah  "Deeder" Zaman (Hindi: सईदउल्लाह दीदार जमान; born 25 July 1978), is a Bangladeshi-British rapper and former lead vocalist for British band Asian Dub Foundation.

Early life
Zaman got involved with music when he was six years old and used to breakdance. He was nine years old when he first started making music and performed his first live performance aged 11. He used to performance with his sister, Parul. He was also a member of Joi Bangla Zaman grew up on reggae and hip hop music, and got into jungle in his teens.

Zaman's father is a homoeopathic doctor, and his elder brother, Saifullah "Sam" Zaman (1965–2015, also known as State of Bengal), was a DJ and music producer. In 1987, Zaman became an original member of his brother's State of Bengal group which included MC Mustaq. Zaman attended Stratford School.

Career
At the age of 14, Zaman joined the Community Music, a London-based educational organisation that focuses on collective music making, at Community Music House in Farringdon where bassist Dr Das (Aniruddha Das) taught music technology and civil rights worker DJ John Pandit (Pandit G) helped him out as a youth worker. Zaman attended workshops teaching youths the basics of music technology. In late 1993, the three formed Asian Dub Foundation as a sound system to play at anti-racist gigs. The following year, they recruited guitarist Chandrasonic and evolved into a band. The final member Sun-J joined in 1995. Zaman was the lead vocalist for Asian Dub Foundation and was known as Master D.

In December 2000, he left the band after being inspired by activist work while recording the Asian Dub Foundation song "Free Satpal Ram" about a young man who was convicted and imprisoned for defending himself in a racist attack and being involved with the Satpal Ram campaign. He then devoted his energies to civil rights and anti-racism organisations. He has worked for National Civil Rights Movement, the Campaign Against Racism and Fascism, the Miscarriages of Justice Organisation and the Children with AIDS Charity.

In 2002, Zaman formed Rebel Uprising with multi-instrumentalist Passion and bassist Dennis Rootical from Irration Steppas. In January 2008, Zaman's debut solo album Minority Large was released by Beat Records. In October 2011, his second solo album Pride of the Underdog was released by Modulor.

Zaman contributed to the soundtracks of the 1999 film Brokedown Palace and the 2006 film The Namesake.

Zaman's music features hip hop, reggae and ragas. When he was in Asian Dub Foundation, the genres featured were also punk or jungle punk but his music is now roots based with early reggae and nyabinghi influences. He plays percussion, bass and guitar. His musical influences include Nusrat Fateh Ali Khan, Lata Mangeshkar, Mohammed Rafi, Public Enemy, Tony Rebel and Paban Das Baul.

Discography

Albums

See also
Asian Underground
British Bangladeshis
List of British Bangladeshis

References

External links

Deeder Zaman on ReverbNation

1978 births
Living people
English Muslims
English people of Bangladeshi descent
English hip hop musicians
English male rappers
British activists
Hip hop activists
Desi musicians
Rappers from London
Writers from London
People educated at Stratford School